Korea New Network (KNN) is the biggest regional free-to-air commercial broadcasting station based in Centum City, a high-tech media development complex within Haeundae in Busan, South Korea. KNN is affiliated with SBS. It was originally founded in April 1994 as Pusan Broadcasting Corporation (PSB). It had first begun its demo transmissions upon its establishment in April, and later on September 7 the same year it had begun its test transmissions, and then commenced its official broadcasts on May 14, 1995. As of 2011 its own programs make up to 35 percent of all programs.

Stations

 Television
Channel - Ch. 15 (LCN 6-1)
Launched - May 14, 1995
Affiliated to - SBS
Call Sign - HLDG-DTV
 FM radio 1 (KNN Power FM)
Frequency - FM 99.9 MHz (Busan), 102.5 MHz (Changwon), FM 105.5 MHz (Jinju), 96.3 MHz (Gijang, Yangsan,  Jeonggwan), 106.7 MHz (Geochang)
Launched - September 9, 1997 (Busan), December 29, 2010 (Changwon), December 23, 2011 (Jinju), September 16, 2013 (Gijang, Yangsan, Jeonggwan), December 23, 2013 (Yangsan), September 23, 2016(Geochang, Hamyang)
Affiliated to - SBS Power FM
Call Sign - HLDG-FM
 FM Radio 2 (KNN Love FM)
Frequency - FM 105.7 MHz (Busan), 88.5 MHz (Yangsan), 89.3 MHz (Gijang, Jeonggwan), 90.9 MHz (Changwon), 98.7 MHz (Jinju)
Launched - May 10, 2016 (Busan), May 10, 2017 (Gijang, Jeonggwan, Yangsan), October 30, 2017 (Changwon), March 24, 2018 (Jinju)
Affiliated to - SBS Love FM
Call Sign - HLDG-SFM

See also 
SBS (Korea)
 Busan and Gyeongsangnam-do
 Centum City
 Nexen Tire - the biggest shareholder of this broadcaster.
 Lotte Giants and NC Dinos - KNN Radio provides almost every single KBO League Baseball game of both regional teams.  
 Busan International Film Festival - KNN is the official sponsor and broadcaster of this festival.
 Busan International Comedy Festival - KNN is the official sponsor and broadcaster of this festival.

References

External links 
 

Seoul Broadcasting System affiliates
Television networks in South Korea
Mass media companies of South Korea
Television channels in South Korea
Television channels and stations established in 1994
Companies listed on KOSDAQ
Mass media in Busan
Companies based in Busan